André Salifou (born 1942) is a Nigerien politician, diplomat, and professor. He was president of the High Council of the Republic during the 1991–93 transitional period, briefly served as Minister of Foreign Affairs in 1996, and was an unsuccessful presidential candidate in 1999.

Biography
Salifou was born in Zinder. He died  on May 14th 2022 at the age of 80 years. From 1972 to 1979, Etudes, diplômes et grades universitaires

Né en 1942, le pensionnaire du foyer métis de Zinder qui a fréquenté l’école régionale de Zinder s’est intéressé au théâtre dès l’âge de 10 ans. Sa passion pour la scène l’a amené à suivre des cours à l’Institut d’Art Dramatique dans la capitale ivoirienne Abidjan alors qu’il effectuait ses études secondaires au Lycée de Cocody de 1961 à 1963. Il a effectué ses études supérieures à l’Université de Toulouse le Mirail (France). En 1967 il obtint sa licence es-sciences humaines (option Histoire) puis, un doctorat de 3èmecycle sur le Damagaram soutenue en 1970 ; enfin, une thèse de Doctorat d’état sur la colonisation dans l’espace Nigérien soutenue en 1979. A l’époque, la thèse de Doctorat d’Etat qui sera supprimée dans les années 1980 était le dernier diplôme universitaire dans le système français.

En ce qui concerne les inscriptions sur les listes d’aptitude aux différentes fonctions et grades universitaires, les universitaires nigériens de la première génération (les Pr Dan Dicko, PR Sidikou H. Harouna, Ba Boubakar, Abdou Moumouni, Diouldé Laya, etc., ont évolué dans le système français. C’est ainsi que le Pr André Salifou est passé Maitre Assistant en 1970 après sa thèse de 3ème cycle, Maitre de conférence en 1979 après sa thèse d’Etat puis Professeur Titulaire en 1981 sur une liste d’aptitude aux fonctions de Professeur Titulaire agrée par le Comité Consultatif universitaire (CCU) de Niamey. A l’instar de la presque totalité des universitaires nigériens, le Pr André Salifou est un sac à dos, c’est-à-dire qu’il a effectué toute ses études supérieures parallèlement à sa carrière de fonctionnaire de l’Etat nigérien ou fonctionnaire international Il a servi comme enseignant au CEG de Dogondoutchi (1964-1965). Au niveau national le Pr André Salifou va occuper respectivement les fonctions suivantes : professeur puis directeur par Intérim de l’Ecole Normale de Zinder (formule Unesco) ; de 1979 à 1984 Professeur et Doyen de l’Ecole de Pédagogie qui deviendra plus tard Faculté de Pédagogie puis Ecole Normale supérieure. he worked for the Agency of Cultural and Technical Cooperation (Agence de Coopération Culturelle et Technique), UNESCO, and the Common African and Mauritian Organization. He then became a professor of history at the University of Niamey until 1991. For his doctorate d'état he wrote the thesis Colonisation et sociétés indigènes au Niger de la fin du XIXe siècle à la début de la Seconde Guerre mondiale (Colonization and indigenous societies of Niger from the end of the 19th century to the beginning of the Second World War).

Political career

Role in the National Conference and High Council of the Republic
At the end of the 1980s the military regime of Brigadier General Ali Saibou came under increasing domestic pressure and civil resistance. At the end of 1990, the regime acquiesced to demands for a return to civilian rule and a national conference was convened in July 1991 to prepare the way for the adoption of a new constitution and the holding of free and fair elections. Professor Salifou was chosen as a neutral figure to be president of the Presidium of the National Conference, which was held from July 29, 1991, to November 3, 1991 and established a transitional government leading to democratic elections. At the Conference, he was elected as president of the High Council of the Republic, which was created to function in a legislative role during the transitional period, which lasted from November 1991 to April 1993. In late February 1992 he was briefly kidnapped, along with the Interior Minister, Mohamed Moussa, by soldiers demanding back pay; he and Moussa were freed after the soldiers were promised that they would receive the pay.

Opposition politician
In the February 1993 parliamentary election, Salifou was a candidate for his party, the Union of Democratic and Progressive Patriots (UPDP-Chamoua), in Zinder constituency, and was elected to the National Assembly. Like Prime Minister Ahmadou Cheiffou, he was prohibited by the National Conference from standing as a candidate in the presidential election held later in the same month due to his role as president of the High Council of the Republic. Following the election, the UPDP, which was led by Salifou, formed part of the opposition along with the National Movement for the Development of Society (MNSD). Salifou participated in an opposition protest on April 16, 1994, and was arrested along with 90 others, including MNSD leader Tandja Mamadou.

Under military rule
After Ibrahim Baré Maïnassara seized power in a military coup on January 27, 1996, Salifou was appointed Minister of State in charge of Higher Education and Research in the new transitional government named on February 1. Three months later, on May 5, Salifou was instead named Minister of State in charge of Foreign Relations. He left this position in December 1996, when he was moved to the post of Minister of State in charge of relations with the Assemblies; he remained in the latter position until December 1997.

Return to democracy
In late August 1999, Salifou announced that he would run as the UPDP candidate in the October 1999 presidential election. In the election, he placed sixth with 2.08% of the vote.

After the 1999 election, Salifou acted in a diplomatic role for international organizations. He was special envoy of La Francophonie to the Comoros; on March 15, 2001, the Comoran opposition alleged that Salifou, together with the French ambassador, had been secretly working against the presence of the Organization of African Unity in the Comoros. Later, on April 30, 2002, Salifou was named special envoy of OAU Secretary-General Amara Essy to Madagascar.

Salifou was appointed by President Tandja as his special representative to La Francophonie, and he was included in the Nigerien delegation to La Francophonie's ninth summit, held in Beirut in October 2002. He also headed an African Union mission to the Central African Republic in November 2002, meeting with Central African President Ange-Félix Patassé on November 19 to discuss "the conditions for the restoration of peace in the CAR". On February 13, 2003, he was designated as the special representative of Essy, who was by this time the interim chairman of the commission of the African Union, to Côte d'Ivoire.

After Mahamadou Issoufou took office as president, he appointed Salifou as special adviser to the president, with the rank of minister, on 20 April 2011. Salifou was to hold that post concurrently with his role as the president's personal representative to La Francophonie.

References

1942 births
Living people
Ministers of council of Niger
Foreign ministers of Niger
Members of the National Assembly (Niger)
Union of Democratic and Progressive Patriots politicians
People from Zinder Region